The Colegio Nautilus (Nautilus School) is a bilingual private school in the city of Acapulco, Guerrero, Mexico founded in 1986. The institution offers its services in the Preschool, Elementary and Middle School levels. The school offers the University of Cambridge ESOL Examinations for learning English as a second language (ESOL). This examinations have been offered since 1986. The School includes the highly acclaimed High/Scope approach in Preschool.  In this approach, the teacher tends to not teach the ideas, but rather "provide experiences and materials that help children develop the broad language and logical abilities that are the foundation for later academic learning. For example, to encourage children's beginning reading and writing skills, teachers create a print-rich environment and provide opportunities throughout the day for children to listen to stories, explore books and other print materials, and work with writing tools and materials The program of marine education for children M.A.R.E from the Lawrence Hall of Science from the University of Berkeley, California, USA and the first in offering digital media training courses from Apple Inc to children and starting the 21st century learning initiative by providing an iPad to each of its students.

History

Before the  development of tourism in Acapulco in the 1980s, there was a mismatch between academic endeavour and attainment. With the development of new infrastructure such as  the "Del Sol" Highway (Mexican Federal Highway 95), Acapulco required a new educational model. The ambitions of the tourism industry, the modernising local community and incomers called for better and trilingual education.

By September 1987 the Nautilus School was inaugurated thanks to the great support of distinguished local industrialists summoned by the patronage of the school. By beginning of the 1990s the school had managed to certify their students with English as a second language providing Cambridge certification, provide an ubiquitously  environmental education and to be the first school in Acapulco with a computerized multimedia hall. 
In the year of 1995 the school made an agreement with Lions Clubs International to buy their facilities and transform it from a social club into a school campus. The school has maintained the leadership in each of this matters, specially that of technological culture, being the first school in Acapulco in obtaining the service that allows the parents of our lower school students to see their children work in the classroom via Internet and being again the first school in Acapulco to have a technological partnership with Apple Inc.

In 2008 the school designed new architectonic facilities to provide the students with the latest technological advances that go from interactive blackboards to promoting the use of laptops or iPad amongst the students instead of the traditional books and notebooks. At 22 years since its foundation, the school has developed architectonic spaces that teachers aptitudes of and student allow to the optimization of the creative generating suitable processes of learning to obtain the excellence.

Institutional Programs
  Educational Technology
 
The use of technology has always played a mayor role in the school's community. This is why one or its most important institutional programs in The Nautilus School is Computer studies. They have the honor of being members of the International Society for Technology in Education (ISTE), which provides service to improve teaching, learning and school leadership, through the effective use of technology from Preschool though Secondary, and  gives them ongoing teacher training in the area of technology. Through the partnership with Apple, Microsoft, the school was able to develop technological abilities in their students, using the most advanced tools and methodologies. The classrooms are equipped with different technological equipments, like Apple's iPad Mobile Labs in each classroom, helping teachers give a more dynamic class having a mayor impact on the students.
With the extensive variety of subscriptions to different educational sites on the web and a wide variety of software, they enrich the methodology and the subjects that are given in class by using technology as a tool and support. Teachers and students have access to a video distribution system on demand called Digital Cinema, which can be accessed in real time from any place and platform inside the school through the local network, and which gives them access to a large library of movies and documentaries. Middle School students are being prepared to achieve the Certificate in Microsoft Office Specialist and the Apple Certificate in Training Series in the multimedia iLife and iWork suite.
 Environmental education
 
The school is a strong promoter of environmental education throughout the student body, making them aware of the pollution and deforestation problems our planet is facing, amongst others.
some of the campaigns the school has come up with to make it easier for children to understand how important it is to take care of our mother earth include:
ocean week
earth day fair
meatless Mondays
ecology classes
recycling competitions
clean it, green it, mean it (a program that is in charge of cleaning nearby beaches)
the school also promotes vegetarianism and off campus recycling

Private schools in Mexico
Educational institutions established in 1986
Acapulco
Buildings and structures in Guerrero
Education in Guerrero
1986 establishments in Mexico